Grigol Dolidze (born 25 October 1982) is a Georgian footballer who currently plays for FC Samgurali Tskhaltubo.

Career

International career
He has been capped 3 time for the national team.

References

External links

1982 births
People from Guria
Living people
Footballers from Georgia (country)
Association football midfielders
Georgia (country) international footballers
FC Guria Lanchkhuti players
FC Mertskhali Ozurgeti players
FC Spartaki Tbilisi players
FC Sioni Bolnisi players
FC Ameri Tbilisi players
Simurq PIK players
FC Metalurgi Rustavi players
FC Zugdidi players
FC Dila Gori players
FC Zestafoni players
FC Samtredia players
FC Shukura Kobuleti players
FC Torpedo Kutaisi players
Erovnuli Liga players
Azerbaijan Premier League players
Expatriate footballers from Georgia (country)
Expatriate footballers in Azerbaijan
Expatriate sportspeople from Georgia (country) in Azerbaijan